O'Fallon is a city in St. Clair County, Illinois, United States. The 2020 census listed the population at 32,289. The city is the second largest city in the Metro-East region and Southern Illinois.

Like its namesake in St. Charles County, Missouri, O'Fallon is part of the St. Louis Metropolitan Statistical Area. This makes O'Fallon (along with the two Troys in Illinois and Missouri) one of the few pairs of like-named municipalities to be part of the same MSA.

History
Founded in 1854, O'Fallon's namesake comes from Colonel John O'Fallon who was a wealthy gentleman from St. Louis. In downtown O'Fallon, a Baltimore and Ohio Railroad railroad depot was built, which helped put O'Fallon on the map. City lots were platted and sold at a public auction on May 18, 1854. A post office was established the following year and the city began attracting German settlers looking for fertile farming land. On January 27, 1874, O'Fallon was incorporated as a village. On March 14, 1905, the citizens voted for a change to the city form of government. Since its founding, O'Fallon has gained population every decennial census year except 1930, when the census showed a net loss of six residents.

The city center is approximately two miles east of the intersection of Interstate 64 and U.S. Route 50.  Suburban growth in O'Fallon expanded considerably during the 1980s and following the expansion of Interstate 64 in the 1990s. Subdivisions include Thornbury Hill, Nolin Creek Estates, Fairwood Hills, Deer Creek, Forest Hills, and Fairwood East. O'Fallon Township High School's main campus at 600 South Smiley Street has undergone numerous additions over the past decades to ease overcrowding, including the creation of the separate 9th Grade Milburn Campus.

O'Fallon's city seal was designed in 1974 by Michael Donovan, an OTHS freshman, during a contest held by the O'Fallon Junior Woman's Club to create a city flag. In May 1975, the design was finalized by Louis Bradshaw and was then adopted by the city as its official flag. According to the 2004 publication by the O'Fallon Historical Society, O'Fallon Sesquicentennial History: "The design is yellow gold on a blue background—the colors of the high school. The pick and shovel represent the coal mines that were so important to O'Fallon's economy for over 100 years. The locomotive represents the railroad to which O'Fallon owes its existence. The planes represent Scott Air Force Base where many in O'Fallon find employment—both military and civil service."

Events
 Tornado outbreak of April 2, 2006

Annual events

 May - Memorial Day To Honor Those Who Gave their lives in service of the nation (O'Fallon Veterans Monument)
 November – Veterans Day Celebration at O'Fallon Veterans Monument; Veterans Day Parade - largest in the area
 November, the Saturday after Thanksgiving - Lighted Holiday Parade

Parks and public services

O'Fallon Parks and Recreation
 Family Sports Park
 Hesse Park
 Katy Cavin's Community Center
 O'Fallon Community Park
 O'Fallon Memorial Pool
 Rock Springs Nature Park
 Nature center
 Jogging/cycling paths
 Nature trails
 Natural prairie
 Dog Park
 MCT Goshen Trailhead  
 St. Clair Recreation Complex
 St. Ellen Mine Park
 Thoman Park
 Veteran's Monument
Library
 O'Fallon Public Library
Registered historic places
 Scott Field Historic District

Schools

 O'Fallon Community Consolidated School District #90
 Delores Moye Elementary School
 Estelle Kampmeyer Elementary School
 J. E. Hinchcliffe Sr. Elementary School
 Laverna Evans Elementary School
 Marie Schaefer Elementary School
 Amelia V. Carriel Junior High School
 Edward A. Fulton Junior High School
 O'Fallon Central School District #104
 O'Fallon Township High School District No. 203
 O'Fallon Township High School

Private schools
 Discovery School
 St. Clare Catholic School
 First Baptist Academy

Geography
O'Fallon is located at  (38.591549, −89.912000). O'Fallon is:
  from Scott Air Force Base
  from McKendree University

Demographics

As of the census of 2010, there were 28,281 people, 8,310 households, and 6,016 families living in the city. The population density was /sq mi (/km). There were 8,310 housing units at an average density of /sq mi (/km). The racial makeup of the city was 82.67% White, 11.99% African American, 0.23% Native American, 2.47% Asian, 0.07% Pacific Islander, 0.79% from other races, and 1.77% from two or more races. Hispanic or Latino of any race were 2.23% of the population.

Of the 8,310 households 39.6% had children under the age of 18 living with them, 59.0% were married couples living together, 10.5% had a female householder with no husband present, and 27.6% were non-families. 23.2% of households were one person and 7.2% were one person aged 65 or older. The average household size was 2.62 and the average family size was 3.13.

The age distribution was 28.3% under the age of 18, 8.0% from 18 to 24, 32.2% from 25 to 44, 22.7% from 45 to 64, and 8.9% 65 or older. The median age was 35 years. For every 100 females, there were 93.2 males. For every 100 females age 18 and over, there were 90.1 males.

The median household income was $55,927 and the median family income  was $66,262. Males had a median income of $46,303 versus $30,158 for females. The per capita income for the city was $24,821. About 4.1% of families and 5.0% of the population were below the poverty line, including 5.0% of those under age 18 and 7.9% of those age 65 or over.

Notable people 

 Bob Cryder, professional football player
 Bernie Fuchs, illustrator
 William Holden, Academy Award-winning actor
 Joseph W. Schmitt, spacesuit technician for the National Aeronautics and Space Administration

Gallery

References

External links
 City of O'Fallon
 O'Fallon Chamber of Commerce
 

Cities in St. Clair County, Illinois
Populated places established in 1854
Cities in Illinois
1854 establishments in Illinois